The annual 2012 LKL All-star game, was held in Švyturys Arena, in Klaipėda, on March 3.

Teams 

 Mindaugas Katelynas was replaced by Laimonas Kisielius, due to injury.
 Nelson Reeves was replaced by Lawrence Roberts, due to his contract termination with Žalgiris.

Coaches 
"Lietuviai" was coached by Lithuanian Antanas Sireika, of Šiauliai, who acquired 5,734 votes. "Time Team" was coached by Serbian Aleksandar Trifunović, of Žalgiris, who acquired 9,247 votes.

Notables

Lietuviai team 
 Jonas Valančiūnas – 23 minutes, 25 points (11/16 2PT, 1/1 3PT), 13 rebounds, 6 assists, 1 block
 Mindaugas Kuzminskas – 23 minutes, 24 points (10/12 2PT, 1/3 3PT, 1/2 FT), 4 rebounds, 2 assists, 2 blocks
 Renaldas Seibutis – 22 minutes, 17 points (4/6 2PT, 3/4 3PT), 3 rebounds, 3 assists, 1 block
 Mantas Kalnietis – 19 minutes, 13 points (5/6 2PT, 1/2 3PT), 4 rebounds, 11 assists, 3 blocks

Time team 
 Sonny Weems – 18 minutes, 21 points (6/8 2PT, 3/7 3PT), 5 rebounds, 4 blocks
 Rashaun Broadus – 21 minutes, 20 points (4/7 2PT, 4/4 3PT), 3 rebounds, 6 assists, 1 block
 Milovan Raković – 20 minutes, 13 points, (5/5 2PT, 1/3 3PT), 3 rebounds, 1 block
 Trévon Hughes – 17 minutes, 11 points (4/5 2PT, 1/7 3PT), 1 rebound, 5 assists, 5 blocks

References 

Lietuvos krepšinio lyga All-Star Game
All Star